Acheilognathus elongatoides is a species of freshwater ray-finned fish in the genus Acheilognathus.  It is endemic to Vietnam and grows to a maximum length of 9.8 cm.

References

Acheilognathus
Fish described in 2001
Fish of Vietnam
Endemic fauna of Vietnam